Vinayak Vikram (born 18 November 1997) is an Indian first class cricketer who plays for Jharkhand.

References

External links
 

Year of birth missing (living people)
Living people
Indian cricketers
Jharkhand cricketers
Place of birth missing (living people)